Tyson Marsh (born June 20, 1984) is a Canadian former professional ice hockey defenceman who last played for the Cardiff Devils in the Elite Ice Hockey League in the United Kingdom.

Career statistics

External links

1984 births
Living people
Alaska Aces (ECHL) players
Canadian ice hockey defencemen
Cardiff Devils players
Chicago Wolves players
Columbia Inferno players
HC Alleghe players
Ice hockey people from British Columbia
Reading Royals players
Rockford IceHogs (AHL) players
Pensacola Ice Pilots players
SC Riessersee players
St. John's Maple Leafs players
Toronto Marlies players
Vancouver Giants players
Canadian expatriate ice hockey players in the United States
Canadian expatriate ice hockey players in Wales
Canadian expatriate ice hockey players in Italy
Canadian expatriate ice hockey players in Germany